Juraguá is a Cuban village and consejo popular ("people's council", i.e. hamlet) of the municipality of Abreus, in Cienfuegos Province. With a population of ca. 7,000 it is the most populated village in the municipality after Abreus.

History
The village was founded in 1849 by Tomás Terry Adans as a farm (Central Juraguá) and grew around the homonym henequenera, a plantation of  henequen that produces and packages sisal fiber, founded in 1923.

In 1976 Cuba and the Soviet Union signed an agreement to construct two nuclear power reactors near Juraguá, and the construction of Juragua Nuclear Power Plant, the only one built in Cuba, started in 1983. Named after the village, but located within Cienfuegos municipal territory, it was not completed and abandoned in 2000.

Geography
Located on a peninsula between Cienfuegos Bay and the Caribbean Sea, Juraguá lies near the borders of Matanzas Province at the Zapata Swamp (Cienaga de Zapata). The settlement extends south of a road linking Abreus (24 km north), to the Jagua Fortress (Castillo de Jagua, 11 km east). It is 3 km far from Nueva Juraguá, 5 from Juragua Nuclear Power Plant, 30 from Cienfuegos and Yaguaramas, and 35 from Rodas.

Transport
Juraguá is served by the "Abreus-Jagua", a provincial road linked to the state highway Circuito Sur (CS). An industrial railway, starting in Aguada de Pasajeros and ending at the nuclear plant, crosses the village to the south.

See also
Matun
Juragua Nuclear Power Plant
Municipalities of Cuba
List of cities in Cuba

References

External links

Populated places in Cienfuegos Province
Populated places established in 1849